Stardrift and Other Fantastic Flotsam is a collection of science fiction short stories by Emil Petaja.  It was first published in 1971 by Fantasy Publishing Company, Inc. in an edition of 1,500 copies.  Most of the stories originally appeared in the magazines Weird Tales, If, Fantasy and Science Fiction, Amazing Stories, Fantastic Adventures, Magazine of Horror and Imagination.

Contents
 Introduction, by Forrest J Ackerman
 "Stardrift"
 "Moon Fever"
 "Where Is Thy Sting"
 "A Dog’s Best Friend"
 "Peacemonger"
 "The Dark Balcony"
 "Hunger"
 "Dark Hollow"
 "Dodecagon Garden"
 "Only Gone Before"
 "The Answer"
 "Be a Wingdinger, Earn Big Money"
 "Pattern for Plunde"
 "Found Objects"

References

1971 short story collections
Science fiction short story collections
Fantasy Publishing Company, Inc. books